The Lycée Français International d'Amman (LFIA) is a French international school in Amman, Jordan. It serves levels maternelle (preschool) through lycée (senior high school).

The primary school has a main campus along Deir Ghbar. The secondary school is along Route de l’aéroport.

References

External links

  Lycée Français d'Amman

Amman
International schools in Jordan
Schools in Amman
1972 establishments in Jordan
Educational institutions established in 1972